Wollongong is a seaside city in the Illawarra region of New South Wales, Australia.

Wollongong may also refer to:

 City of Wollongong, a local government area in the Illawarra region of New South Wales, Australia
 Electoral district of Wollongong, New South Wales, Australia
 , a list of ships
 Wollongong Airport, Albion Park Rail, New South Wales
 The Wollongong Group, an American software company
 University of Wollongong

See also